Lionel Girard (born 29 August 1953) is a French rower. He competed in the men's coxed four event at the 1976 Summer Olympics.

References

1953 births
Living people
French male rowers
Olympic rowers of France
Rowers at the 1976 Summer Olympics
Place of birth missing (living people)